The MacMahon family originated in Ireland and established itself in France, where it gained prominence. John MacMahon, an Irish doctor born in Limerick, became naturalised in France in 1749 and married Charlotte Le Belin, Dame d'Éguilly, on 13 April 1750. That same year, King Louis XV of France created him Marquis d'Éguilly. His son, the second Marquis, served in the American War of Independence, including on the frigate Aigle which the British captured on 15 September 1782.

A grandson of the first Marquis, Patrice de MacMahon, served with distinction as a general in the Crimean War of 1853–56 and later in the Austro-Sardinian War of 1859, winning the Battle of Magenta on 4 June 1859. The following day Emperor Napoleon III created him Duc de Magenta. Later he became President of the French Republic, serving from 1873 to 1879.

The marquesal title held by the senior line of the family was inherited in 1894 by the younger ducal line, and both titles remain extant.

Marquises of d'Éguilly (1750)
The holders of the title of Marquis d'Éguilly have included:
Jean Baptiste MacMahon, 1st Marquis de MacMahon (1715–1775)
 (1752-1830)
Charles Marie MacMahon, 3rd Marquis de MacMahon (1793–1845)
Charles Henri MacMahon, 4th Marquis de MacMahon (1828–1863)
Charles Marie MacMahon, 5th Marquis de MacMahon (1856–1894)
Marie Armand Patrice MacMahon, 6th Marquis de MacMahon (1855–1927); he had previously succeeded as 2nd Duc de Magenta (see below)

Dukes of Magenta (1859)
The holders of the title of Duc de Magenta have included:
Marie Edme Patrice Maurice de MacMahon, 1st Duc de Magenta (1808–1893)
Marie Armand Patrice MacMahon, 2nd Duc de Magenta, 6th Marquis de MacMahon (1855-1927)
Maurice de MacMahon, 3rd Duc de Magenta, 7th Marquis de MacMahon (1903–1954)
Philippe de MacMahon, 4th Duc de Magenta, 8th Marquis de MacMahon (1938–2002)
Maurice de MacMahon, 5th Duc de Magenta, 9th Marquis de MacMahon (born 1992)

See also
 Conte di Magenta, an Italian noble title

Sources

 
 
 
Magenta